This is a list of GoldSrc mods (modifications) for the video game Half-Life.

The list is divided into two categories: clientside and serverside mods. These terms do not necessarily indicate whether each mod can be run on multiplayer servers.
Clientside mods add content to the game, such as a new storyline, models or sounds. In contrast, serverside mods add functionality.

Clientside mods

Single-player mods
Cry of Fear – The spiritual successor of Afraid of Monsters, it puts the player in the shoes of Simon, a paraplegic who writes a book for therapy, and in the process faces the inner demons that plague his thoughts. It features a co-op mode. Though initially a mod, it was later released as a free standalone game in 2013 via Steam.
Escape from Woomera – An unfinished point-and-click adventure game, intended to critique the treatment of mandatorily detained asylum seekers in Australia as well as the Australian government's attempt to impose a media blackout on the detention centers.
They Hunger – This is a single-player horror-based mod. It was released by Neil Manke's Black Widow Games in three episodes, the first in 1999, the second in 2000, and the final installment in 2001. All three were at one point bundled with PC Gamer magazine.
 USS Darkstar – This mod follows a scientist on a deep-space scientific mission aboard an interstellar spacecraft. When an experiment goes awry, the player has to defend himself against aliens. This mod was featured by the PC Gamer magazine on its demo CD in 2001.
 Wanted! – A Wild West-style mod which follows a town Sheriff and his hunt for a bandit. Enemies include rattlesnakes, Native Americans and other outlaws. It contains original voice acting and era-specific weapons, and was created by Maverick Developments and released as a free mod. For some time it was bundled with the retail version of Counter-Strike, along with another mod by Maverick Developments, Absolute Redemption which was a chapter set between Half-Life and Half-Life 2.

Multiplayer mods

Team deathmatch
 Action Half-Life – A team-based multiplayer mod developed as part of the popular series of "Action"-based mods, designed to emulate the feel of an action movie. Members of the development team had previously worked with developers of Counter-Strike on the mod Action Quake 2.
 Counter-Strike – A team-based tactical first-person shooter game involving rounds of combat between two teams, counter-terrorists and terrorists. Counter-Strike was later released commercially by Valve as a standalone game.
  – A free, official Half-Life mod by Valve that updates the multiplayer gameplay from id Software's Quake, featuring enhanced textures, models, and lighting. It was released on June 7, 2001, and included in an update to Half-Life a month later. OS X and Linux ports of the Windows game were released through Steam in August 2013.
 Earth's Special Forces – Fighting oriented game based on manga/anime Dragon Ball Z with unique three dimensional battle system.
 Firearms – A team deathmatch-based game where the emphasis is on weapons and player customization.
 Frontline Force – A team oriented first person shooter mod in which players are divided into 2 teams: Attackers and Defenders.
  – A free, official Half-Life mod by Valve. It was released on November 1, 2000, and included in Half-Life version 1.1.1.0 update, released on June 12, 2002. Ports of the game to OS X and Linux were released through Steam on August 1, 2013.
 Science and Industry – A team-based multiplayer mod in which players take the roles of security guards at two competing research firms. It features a weapons research system.
 The Specialists – This multiplayer mod is intended to resemble a stylized action movies.

Objective gameplay
 Day of Defeat – A World War II first-person shooter, originally a mod and later a commercially released game.
 Team Fortress Classic – Originally a mod ported from QuakeWorld that introduced a class-system style of play that allowed for many diverse playing styles. With the introduction of Steam it became a standalone game and as of October 10, 2007 it has a commercially released sequel Team Fortress 2.
 Global Warfare – A team play class-based mod set in the Middle East with frantic gameplay and new features (e.g. troop transports taking players into battle).

Other
 Master-Sword – A role-playing game originally released in 1998, it has since gone through several revivals.
 Natural Selection – A mod in which two teams (humans and aliens) fight against each other. Its utilizes a mixture of first-person shooter and real-time strategy gameplay. It gained a standalone successor, Natural Selection 2.
 The Ship – Set on a 1920s recreational cruise ship. Each player is assigned a quarry, and the object is to murder him or her with nobody watching, while at the same time watching out for, and defending themselves against their own hunter. Later released as a standalone game on the Source engine.
 Sven Co-op – Is a co-op mod in which players fight against computer-controlled enemies, it was released as a standalone game in 2016. Apart from user contributed missions it is also possible to play co-operatively through the original Half-Life game and its expansions, though the expansions can only be accessed if owned by everyone in the server.

See also
List of Source engine mods
List of video games derived from mods

References

 
Mods
GoldSrc
Half-Life mods
pt:AMX Mod X